HMS Ajax was a  of the Royal Navy. She was built by the famous Cammell Laird company of Birkenhead. Ajax was launched on 16 August 1962 and commissioned on 10 December 1963.

Construction
Ajax was built by Cammell Laird of Birkenhead. Ajax was launched on 16 August 1962 and was commissioned on 11 December 1963. Total construction cost was £4,800,000

Displacement was  standard and  full load.

A twin  Mark 6 gun mount was fitted forward. While the Leander class was planned to be fitted with the Sea Cat surface-to-air missile, Ajax was completed with two Bofors 40 mm anti-aircraft guns as a temporary substitute until Sea Cat could be fitted. A Limbo anti-submarine mortar was fitted aft to provide a short-range anti-submarine capability, while a hangar and helicopter deck allowed a single Westland Wasp helicopter to be operated, for longer range anti-submarine and anti-surface operations.

As built, Ajax was fitted with a large Type 965 long range air search radar on the ship's mainmast, with a Type 993 short range air/surface target indicating radar and Type 974 navigation radar carried on the ship's foremast. An MRS3 fire control system was carried to direct the 4.5-inch guns. The ship had a sonar suite of Type 177 medium range search sonar, Type 162 bottom search and Type 170 attack sonar, while the ship was designed to carry a Type 199 variable depth sonar (VDS), this was not installed on Ajax.

Service history
In 1964, Ajax deployed to the Far East, becoming the leader of the 24th Escort Group. It was a long deployment, and she did not return to the UK until 1968. Activities included taking part in the Beira Patrol, covering the withdrawal of British forces from operations off Aden, and acting as guardship for Hong Kong. In 1970, Ajax became the Gibraltar guard ship, a required deployment at that time due to the tense fears of invasion by General Franco.

In September 1970, Ajax began a modernisation at Devonport Dockyard that lasted until 1973, having her 4.5-inch gun turret replaced by an Ikara anti-submarine missile system. A pair of quadruple GWS22 SeaCat launchers were fitted aft while the two Bofors guns were retained but moved forward to abreast the ship's mainmast. The Limbo anti-submarine mortar and Wasp helicopter were retained. The long-range Type 965 radar was removed, with improved navigation and target indicating radars fitted, and the ADAWS 5 computer-aided combat direction system added to direct Ikara operations, while the Type 199 VDS was restored.

Following her conversion she became leader of the 8th Frigate Squadron. In 1974, she assisted in the evacuation of British citizens after the Turkish invasion of Cyprus. In 1976, while on a visit to Canada, Ajax visited the town of Ajax, Ontario, which had been named in honour of her predecessor, the Leander-class cruiser Ajax made famous by the Battle of the River Plate during the Second World War. The 'new' Ajax was granted the freedom of the city.

In 1977, Ajax underwent a refit at Devonport Dockyard, deploying in 1979 to the Mediterranean. In 1980, she underwent a refit at Gibraltar which was completed in 1981. That year, Ajax became the leader of the 1st Frigate Squadron. She did not take part in the 1982 Falklands War, but was deployed as Persian Gulf guard ship; she later completed a four-month deployment around the Falklands as part of the South Atlantic Protection Force in 1984. She participated in further deployments that culminated in the highlight of her final year in 1985 when she escorted , which took a number of the Royal Family on a tour of Italy.

Fate
She was decommissioned 31 May 1985, then replaced  as a static training ship at Devonport. On 3 August 1988, Ajax arrived at Millom, Cumbria to be broken up.

Her anchor is now located at the local Royal Canadian Legion Branch (Hunt Street) and bell hangs in the Ajax Town Council Chamber in Ajax, Ontario.

Commanding officers

References

Publications
 
 
 
 

 

Leander-class frigates
Ships built on the River Mersey
1962 ships